The year 2004 is the third year in the history of Cage Warriors, a mixed martial arts promotion based in the United Kingdom. In 2004 Cage Rage Championships held 4 events beginning with, Cage Warriors 6: Elimination.

Events list

Cage Warriors 6: Elimination

Cage Warriors 6: Elimination was an event held on March 7, 2004 in Barnsley, England.

Results

Cage Warriors 7: Showdown

Cage Warriors 7: Showdown was an event held on May 9, 2004 in Barnsley, England.

Results

Cage Warriors 8: Brutal Force

Cage Warriors 8: Brutal Force was an event held on September 18, 2004 in Sheffield, England.

Results

Cage Warriors 9: Xtreme Xmas

Cage Warriors 9: Xtreme Xmas was an event held on December 18, 2004 in Sheffield, England.

Results

See also 
 Cage Warriors

References

Cage Warriors events
2004 in mixed martial arts